Lieutenant General Pham Quoc Thuan was an officer of the Army of the Republic of Vietnam (ARVN). 

Thuần served as commander of the 5th Division from 1962 and was a protégé of Nguyễn Văn Thiệu.

Following the Battle of Đồng Xoài in June 1965, when the 5th Division's 1st Battalion, 7th Infantry Regiment was ambushed by Viet Cong forces in the Thuận Lợi rubber plantation suffering heavy losses, the Division's US adviser reported that Thuần, had "gone to pieces" over the mauling his 7th Regiment had received.

In 1966 US advisers regarded Thuần's 5th Division and the 25th Division as the two worst units in the ARVN. In 1967 MACV assessed that the three ARVN divisions surrounding Saigon, the 5th, 18th and the 25th Division had shown no improvement, and US advisers considered their commanders, Thuần, Do Ke Giai (18th Division) and Phan Trong Chinh (25th Division), flatly incompetent. The senior Junta generals had repeatedly agreed on the need to replace them, but, for political reasons, had taken no action. Although continually judged by American leaders as corrupt and incapable, Thuần had strong political ties with the Junta generals, in this case, Thiệu. John Paul Vann noted the widespread public belief that Thuần not only controlled most of the local bars and prostitution houses but also extorted protection fees for convoys moving through his Division tactical area. General William E. DePuy, commanding the nearby US 1st Infantry Division, agreed. He made the convoy protection charge public, as did a local Vietnamese province chief, perhaps with Vann's encouragement. COMUSMACV General William Westmoreland could do little. He already had taken up the matter previously with Chief of the Joint General Staff General Cao Văn Viên, but to no avail. Thuần had been Thieu's chief of staff when the latter had commanded the 5th Division back in 1962, and the division, together with General Dong's airborne units, remained Thiệu's major basis of power. In the interests of political stability, nothing could be done.

In September 1968 MACV rated General Thuần as inept and 5th Division advisers noted that the Division had "withdrawn into a shell" and was doing nothing constructive." Minor incidents, like Thuần's daily pot shots at birds from the second story balcony of his home and the subsequent accidental wounding of his intelligence adviser, were not uncommon and at times trivialized and mocked the entire war effort. II Field Force, Vietnam commander Lt. Gen. Walter T. Kerwin, Jr. appealed to COMUSMACV General Creighton Abrams for help, and the MACV commander reportedly "raised hell" with President Thiệu over the matter, but Thiệu did nothing.

In August 1969 Thuần was finally removed and replaced by General Nguyễn Văn Hiếu. 

He served as the commander of III Corps, which oversaw the region of the country surrounding the capital Saigon, from 29 October 1973 until 30 October of the next year, when he was replaced by Lieutenant General Du Quoc Dong.

References

Possibly living people
Army of the Republic of Vietnam generals
Year of birth missing